Akshat Raghuwanshi (born 15 September 2003) is an Indian cricketer. He made his first-class debut for Madhya Pradesh in the 2021–22 Ranji Trophy on 24 February 2022. He made his Twenty20 debut for Madhya Pradesh in the 2022–23 Syed Mushtaq Ali Trophy on 11 October 2022. He made his List A debut for Madhya Pradesh in the 2022–23 Vijay Hazare Trophy on 12 November 2022.

References

External links
 

2003 births
Living people
Indian cricketers
Madhya Pradesh cricketers
Place of birth missing (living people)